This list of the tallest buildings and structures in Leeds ranks skyscrapers, structures and towers in the city of Leeds, England by height.

Leeds is a major UK city and regional capital with a city population of 757,700, and a Metro population of 2,302,000 (2001 est).

Currently, the tallest building in Leeds, and also the newest on the list, is Altus House at 114m  which has held the record since topping out in 2020.

The oldest building on the list is Holy Trinity Church, constructed in 1727, which stands at a height of 56.7 m (186 ft).

Over 50 50 metre buildings are under construction, approved or planned for the coming years.

Tallest buildings and structures
This list ranks externally complete Leeds buildings and free-standing structures that stand at least , based on standard height measurement. This includes spires and architectural details but does not include antenna masts. An equals sign (=) following a rank indicates the same height between two or more buildings. The "Year" column indicates the year in which a building was completed. Buildings which have been demolished are not included.

Tallest under construction, approved and proposed

Under construction in autumn 2021

Approved
The information below was last updated in October 2021.

Proposed
This information below was last updated in October 2021.

Unbuilt
This lists proposals for the construction of buildings in Leeds that were planned to rise at least , for which planning permission was rejected or which were otherwise withdrawn.

Other unbuilt

 EMI Westgate Tower, 120–140 metres, 36 storeys (circa 1970, around metres in height, cancelled for excessive height, site now occupied by 1980s Westgate Point development)
 Triple Five Leeds Development - Height unknown (circa 1989, planned complex in Holbeck including shopping, residential and offices which was to include a number of high rise buildings of unspecified height, cancelled)
 Norman Foster plan for Criterion Place for Royal London Insurance - circa 60-70m (proposed 1994, development on site cancelled)
 Kite Tower - 90 m (vision from 2005 since superseded by The Spiracle)
 Mayfair Tower - 98 m (cancelled 2006 due to failure to make profitable)
 Brunswick Place - 91 m and 85 m (vision from 2006 for a redevelopment of this former Leeds Metropolitan University site)
 The Spiricle - 80 m / 262 ft / 25 storeys (cancelled 2008 due to failure to make it profitable)
 Cromwell Mount Towers (unapproved due to inappropriate height)
 Manor Point (student residence) - cancelled 2006 due to failure to be profitable.
 Millgarth Tower - Now the site of the new John Lewis store and former Millgarth police station
 Leeds One by Ian Simpson Architects. Leeds One (on the former Tetley's Brewery site) was taken over by the Vastint project with entirely new plans and design.

Demolished buildings
 Elland Road four floodlights - 79m / 260 ft. Constructed 1970 demolished 1991-3 for replacement with new East Stand and lighting above stands.
 Albion Tower aka Leeds Permanent Building Society Tower - 61 m / 200 ft. Constructed 1960s demolished 1998 for replacement with The Light leisure / shopping complex.

History of tallest buildings in Leeds

See also
 Listed buildings in Leeds
 List of council high-rise apartment buildings in the City of Leeds 
 List of tallest buildings in Yorkshire

References

External links 
 SkyscraperNews: Leeds
 Broadcasting Tower Website
 Broadcasting Tower - Downing Information Page

Lists of tallest buildings in the United Kingdom
 
Tallest buildings
Tallest